Busan Presbyterian University, also known as Busan Jangsin University, is a private Christian university in Gimhae City, South Gyeongsang province, in southeastern South Korea.  It provides undergraduate training in theology, social welfare, and special education, as well as graduate training in theology and pastoral research.

History

The school was established in 1953 in Busan as a small three-year theological school.  The current campus in Gimhae was acquired in 1996.

See also
List of colleges and universities in South Korea
Education in South Korea

External links 
 Official school website, in Korean

Universities and colleges in South Gyeongsang Province
Gimhae
Educational institutions established in 1953
1953 establishments in South Korea